The Lagamar de Cananéia State Park is a state park in the state of São Paulo, Brazil.

Location

The Lagamar de Cananéia State Park is in the municipalities of Cananéia and Jacupiranga, São Paulo.
The park is in the Vale do Ribeira region, and holds part of the Iguape-Cananéia-Paranaguá estuary lagoon complex, one of the largest breeding grounds for South Atlantic marine species.
It was recognized by UNESCO as a core zone of Atlantic Forest Biosphere Reserve, and a natural World Heritage Site.
Tucuxi (Sotalia fluviatilis) dolphins are often seen in the estuary complex.
The Superagui lion tamarin (Leontopithecus caissara) was found in the south sector of the park in 1990, a critically endangered species endemic to the region.

History

The Lagamar de Cananéia State Park is one of several conservation units created by state law 12.810 of 21 February 2008, in which the Jacupiranga Mosaic was created from the former Jacupiranga State Park and its surrounding lands.
The park is a fully protected conservation unit.
Objectives include preservation of ecosystems and genetic diversity, and support of scientific research, environmental education and ecotourism.
As of 2015, access to the park was restricted to researchers, although there were plans to open to the public. As of 2022, according to São Paulo's Guide to Protected Areas, the park is now open to the public every day from 8 AM to 5 PM.

Notes

Sources

State parks of Brazil
Protected areas established in 2008
2008 establishments in Brazil
Protected areas of São Paulo (state)